Downlands College, officially named Downlands Sacred Heart College, is a private, secondary, coeducational, day and boarding school at Harlaxton in Toowoomba, Queensland, Australia. Founded by the Missionaries of the Sacred Heart in 1931, the college began as a boarding school for boys with a total enrolment of 68.

Downlands is Queensland's only Catholic, coeducational, day and boarding school years 4-12.  The school offers boarding for both boys and girls and demand for co-educational boarding is high as it allows families and siblings to remain together. The school has an enrollment of approximately 290 boarders from regional Queensland, interstate and overseas, including indigenous students from communities such as Kowanyama and the Tiwi Islands. The school also provides casual boarding to its day students. Downlands College is one of the biggest boarding schools in Queensland.

College badge
The Downlands College Badge consists of a horizontally-divided field in the College colours, royal blue and cardinal red. The upper of the shield carries a gold gryphon, and the lower half bears the Maltese Cross of the State of Queensland. The shield is surmounted by the heart crest with the letters SHC (Sacred Heart College) supported by a ram's horns and ears of wheat, to symbolise the college's setting in the Darling Downs. The college motto, Fortes in Fide, meaning Strong in Faith is emblazoned under the crest.

House system
Downlands, like many Australian schools, uses a house system in the college. Students are randomly assigned to one of four houses which compete against each other during swimming and athletics carnivals, as well as a drama festival.

The Downlands houses are:

Extra-curricular activities
Downlands College is known as the School of Choice, offering an extensive and varied curriculum and co-curricular offering.

Sport
Downlands has long been recognised as one of the strongest sporting schools in Queensland. Rugby union, football (soccer), netball, cricket, tennis, touch football, softball, Australian rules football, hockey, basketball, athletics and swimming are the main sports played at the college, with a large number of students taking part in organised sport throughout the year. Downlands is a member of the Catholic Secondary Schoolgirls' Sports Association (CaSSSA). The college's mascot is the Gryphon, who makes appearances at certain inter-school competitions.

Arts
One of the newest facilities at Downlands is its large Performing Arts department, catering for all age groups. The College choirs and musical ensembles, as well as individual students, are regular participants in the Toowoomba Eisteddfod. Downlands runs a musical every two years with participation across all grades. Recent musicals include Wicked (2020), Crazy For You (2018), Les Miserables (2016), High School Musical 2, Footloose (2008), The Wiz (2007), Disco Inferno (2006) and SherWoodstock (2005).
With the upcoming musical being another addition to Downlands already extensive Performing Arts retinue. The college also enters teams into the Queensland Debating Union, with much success.

Heritage listing

The grounds of the school contain the heritage-listed Tyson Manor.

Principals

Notable alumni

Senator Gerard Rennick - Federal Senator for Queensland, 2019-
Mike Ahern AO - former Premier of Queensland
Sir Gerard Brennan – Chief Justice of Australia 1995–1998
 Frank Brennan SJ, AO – Jesuit priest, human rights lawyer and academic
 Sir Walter Campbell - judge of the Supreme Court of Queensland, Chancellor of the University of Queensland, and Governor of Queensland
 Major General John Cantwell DSC, LOM, AO - Army officer, author and academic
 Gene Fairbanks - rugby union 
 Greg Holmes - rugby union 
 Tim Horan - rugby union 
 Michael Katsidis - professional boxer
 George Kneipp (1922–1993) - judge of the Supreme Court of Queensland, and Chancellor James Cook University
 Vince Lester - politician 
 Ann Leahy - politician 
 Garrick Morgan - rugby union
 Tony Nunan - CEO of Queensland Gas Company and Royal Dutch Shell in Australia  
 Mary O'Kane - Australian scientist 
 Mark O’Shea - one half of the country music duo O'Shea
 Will Power – international motorsports driver
 Peter Ryan - rugby union and rugby league
 Brett Robinson - rugby union
 Josh Smith - Australian Rules football
 Dominic Tabuna - Nauruan politician 
 Tom Veivers - cricketer and politician
 Dennis Manteit - Rugby League (Australia)

References

External links
 School website
 Missionaries of the Sacred Heart Webpage

Schools in Toowoomba
Catholic primary schools in Queensland
Catholic secondary schools in Queensland
Boarding schools in Queensland
Educational institutions established in 1931
Missionaries of the Sacred Heart
1931 establishments in Australia